Buddleja racemosa, commonly known as the Wand (or Texas) Butterfly Bush, is endemic to the southern edge of the limestone Edwards Plateau in Texas, United States, from Austin to Rocksprings, growing around streams, creeks and springs at elevations of 250 – 750 m. The plant was first named and described by John Torrey in 1859.

Description
Buddleja racemosa is a small, lax, dioecious shrub 0.3 – 1.5 m tall, with greyish-brown rimose bark and persistent old branches. The young branches are terete, tomentose and glandular, bearing small subcoriaceous ovate-oblong to lanceolate leaves 3 – 10 cm long by 1.5 – 4 cm wide, with petioles <2 cm long. The pale yellow inflorescences are 8 – 30 cm long, usually comprising 8 – 12 pairs of small globose heads 0.5 – 0.7 cm in diameter, each head with 6 – 12 flowers. Ploidy: 2n = 38.

Varieties
Norman identifies two varieties distinguished by the number of stellate hairs on the undersides of the leaves:
  Buddleja racemosa var. incana
  Buddleja racemosa var. racemosa

Cultivation
The species is not known to be in cultivation.

References

racemosa
Endemic flora of Texas
Taxa named by John Torrey
Dioecious plants
Flora without expected TNC conservation status